Sapna Mukherjee is a Bollywood playback singer who won the Filmfare Award for Best Female Playback Singer for the song "Tirchi Topi Wale" in Tridev (1989).

Career
She started her singing career in 1986 when music directors, Kalyanji Anandji gave her chance to sing three songs for the movie Janbaaz. Her first breakthrough came in 1989 when Kalyanji Anandji chose her to sing "Tirchi Topi Wale" for the movie Tridev. The song went to become huge hit year.

She worked with music directors such as Nadeem-Shravan, Raamlaxman, Jatin–Lalit, Anand–Milind, Viju Shah, Bappi Lahiri, Laxmikant–Pyarelal, Channi Singh, Rajesh Roshan, Anu Malik, A. R. Rahman and singers like Kishore Kumar, Amit Kumar, Kumar Sanu, SP Balasubramanyam, Udit Narayan, Abhijeet, Mohammed Aziz, Vinod Rathod, Sudesh Bhosle, Sonu Nigam, Babul Supriyo, Lucky Ali, Alka Yagnik, Kavita Krishnamurthy, Sadhana Sargam.

In 2006, she came out with an album entitled "Mere Piya", which included several solo performances
by herself as well as a duet together with popular singer Sonu Nigam. Lata Mangeshkar was present at the release event. Sapna Mukherjee has done staging live concerts in US, Canada and the UK.
She sang for Bollywood leading  actresses: Rekha, Dimple Kapadia, Sridevi, Madhuri Dixit, Juhi Chawla, Karisma Kapoor, Raveena Tandon, Sonali Bendre, Sushmita Sen among others.

Discography

Awards
 Mukherjee received the Filmfare Best Female Playback Award for the song "Tirchi Topi Wale" from Tridev in 1989.

References

External links
 

1960 births
Living people
Bollywood playback singers
Indian women playback singers
Place of birth missing (living people)
Filmfare Awards winners
20th-century Indian women singers
21st-century Indian women singers
21st-century Indian singers
20th-century Indian singers